William Eugene Davis may refer to:

William E. Davis, American head football coach, former university president and Democratic politician
W. Eugene Davis, judge of the United States Court of Appeals for the Fifth Circuit

See also
William Davis (disambiguation)